Arechis I (also Arigis, Aretchis) was the second duke of Benevento from 591 to his death in 641, a reign of half a century.

He was from Friuli and was a relative of the dukes there. He was appointed by King Agilulf in the spring of 591, after Dukes Zotto's death; he was possibly Zotto's nephew. Arechis was practically independent because his duchy was separated from northern Italy by a stretch of Byzantine territory.

He conquered Capua and Venafro in the Campania and areas of the Basilicata and Calabria.  He failed to take Naples after a siege (Zotto had failed likewise), but he took Salerno by the late 620s. He spent the last years of his reign establishing good relations with the Roman Catholics of his duchy.  On his death, having survived many a king, his independence was assured and, depsite his recommendation of his adopted sons Radoald and Grimoald, his domain passed to his son Aiulf.

References

641 deaths
Arechis 1
Lombard warriors
7th-century Lombard people
6th-century rulers in Europe
7th-century rulers in Europe
Year of birth unknown